Vitaliy Borisov (born 5 July 1982) is an Azerbaijani futsal player who plays for KMF Ekonomac and the Azerbaijan national futsal team.

References

External links
UEFA profile

1982 births
Living people
Futsal forwards
Azerbaijani men's futsal players
MFK Dina Moskva players
Araz Naxçivan players